Qina Mich'ini (Aymara  qina, qina qina a musical instrument, mich'i bow, -ni a suffix to indicate ownership, Hispanicized spelling Quenamichini) is a mountain in the Andes of southern Peru, about  high. It is situated in the Moquegua Region, Mariscal Nieto Province, Carumas District. Qina Mich'ini lies southwest of the mountain named Wilaquta and southeast of Phaq'u Tanka, Arichuwa and Qhini Jamach'ini.

References

Mountains of Moquegua Region
Mountains of Peru